In linguistics, a presupposition of a statement is a proposition which must be true in order for the statement to make sense. 

Presupposition may also refer to:

 Presupposition (philosophy), in epistemology, requirements for a belief system to make sense
 Presuppositional apologetics, argues that the existence or non-existence of God is the basic presupposition of all human thought

See also
 Complex question, a fallacy